Bagh-e Tilku-ye Chenar (also Romanized as Bāgh-e Tīlkū-ye Chenār; also known as Bāgh-e Tīkū, Bāgh-e Tīlkā, Bāgh-e Tīlkān, and Bāgh-e Tīlkū) is a village in Chenar Rural District, Kabgian District, Dana County, Kohgiluyeh and Boyer-Ahmad Province, Iran. At the 2006 census, its population was 147, in 31 families.

References 

Populated places in Dana County